A disincentive is something that discourages an individual from performing an action. It is the antonym of incentive. Disincentives may fall within the scope of economics, social issues or politics.

Economic
Economic disincentives are any factors that demotivate an individual from following a particular path. For example, if pay for a particular task is too low, that prospective employee may choose to avoid following that particular employment route. Similarly, if an individual has a particular medical issue and the employer is unable or unwilling to accommodate his or her impediment, that individual will choose to look elsewhere for work.

Politics

The furtherance of disincentives is a tool used by politicians both in foreign policy and domestic policy. Disincentives in foreign policy are means and tactics used to deter an adversary from belligerence. In domestic policy, a disincentive is a tool that aims to deter an individual from breaking the law or otherwise reoffending.

Social

Social disincentives are things that discourage someone from performing an action in their personal life.

See also 
 Cognitive evaluation theory
 Bounty (reward)

References 

Motivation